"El Mar de Sus Ojos" is a song performed by Colombian recording artist Carlos Vives featuring with the hip-hop group ChocQuibTown. Is the lead single from his upcoming album Más + Corazón Profundo (2014). At the Latin Grammy Awards of 2014, the song received a nomination for Record of the Year.

Chart performance 
"El Mar de Sus Ojos", in Colombia debuted at number one on the National-Report chart on the week March 3, 2014, replacing "El Serrucho" by Mr Black. In the United States the song debuted at number eleven on the Billboard Hot Latin Songs chart, logged 11.8 million audience detections in its opening week, according to Nielsen SoundScan. On the Billboard Latin Pop Songs chart, debuted at number fifteen and on the Billboard Tropical Songs at number nine, in both charts the song won the "Greatest Gainer", title that is given to records that have greatest airplay and sales that week.

Track listing 
Digital download
 "El Mar de Sus Ojos" –

Credits and personnel 
Credits adapted from the "El Mar de Sus Ojos" liner notes.
Recording
Recorded at Henson Recording Studio , Los Angeles, USA and The Groove Studios, Miami, USA.

Personnel

Songwriting – Carlos Vives and Hugo Huertas
Music director – Hugo Huertas
Featured artists – ChocQuibTown
Production – Carlos Vives and Andrés Castro

Arrangement – Carlos Vives, Andrés Castro and Miguel Martínez "Mike"
Programming – Andrés Castrp and Miguel Martínez "Mike"
Mastering – Tom Coyne
Mixing – Curt Schneider

Charts

Weekly charts

Year-end charts

See also
List of Billboard number-one Latin songs of 2014

References 

2014 singles
Carlos Vives songs
ChocQuibTown songs
Spanish-language songs
Number-one singles in Colombia
Record Report Top 100 number-one singles
Record Report Top Latino number-one singles
2014 songs
Sony Music Latin singles
Songs written by Carlos Vives